Exomilus pentagonalis, common name the orange rib drillia, is a species of sea snail, a marine gastropod mollusk in the family Raphitomidae.

Description
The length of the shell attains 3.5 mm, its diameter 1.25 mm.

(Original description) The minute shell is telescope-shaped and rather thick. It contains  whorls without the protoconch. The protoconch is absent. The spire is gradated, the whorls straight-sided in the anterior three-fourths, and bevelled at an angle of 45° to the posterior suture, which is distinct and simple. The sculpture consists of five longitudinal ribs, continuous, narrow, erect and prominent. The interspaces are nearly flat, giving a pentagonal section. The spiral sculpture consists of Sublenticular inconspicuous longitudinal and spiral striae, which cross the ribs. The body whorl shows five longitudinal ribs, squarely rhomboidal, angulated near the suture, and carinated at the periphery, the ribs having projecting points here, and the carina being curved between them. The body whorl is excavately contracted below. Scarcely visible sublenticular longitudinal striae in upper part; rather less obsolete spiral striae. These are more valid below the carina, where seven can be counted on the ventral aspect. The aperture is narrow, elongately oblong. The outer lip is varicosely thickened by a rib. The margin is thin, simple, and sharp, straight for four-sevenths of its length, between the angle and the carina, curved towards the notch in the lower two-sevenths, and containing a well marked sinus in the upper seventh, rather more than a semi-circle, not quite reaching to the suture. The columella is straight, slightly concave below. The inner lip is inconspicuous. Ornament unicoloured dull stony-white.<ref>[https://archive.org/details/transactionsofro20roya Verco, J.C. 1896. Descriptions of new species of marine Mollusca of South Australia. Part I.; Transactions of the Royal Society of South Australia v. 20 (1895–1896)] public domain.</ref>

Distribution
This marine species is endemic to Australia and occurs off New South Wales, South Australia and Tasmania.

References

 Hedley, C. 1907. The results of deep sea investigation in the Tasman Sea. Mollusca from eighty fathoms off Narrabeen. Records of the Australian Museum 6: 283–304 
 Hedley, C. 1922. A revision of the Australian Turridae. Records of the Australian Museum 13(6): 213–359, pls 42–56 
 May, W.L. 1923. An Illustrated Index of Tasmanian Shells: with 47 plates and 1052 species''. Hobart : Government Printer 100 pp.
  Tucker, J.K. 2004 Catalog of recent and fossil turrids (Mollusca: Gastropoda). Zootaxa 682:1–1295

External links
 

Raphitomidae
Gastropods of Australia
Gastropods described in 1896